Hintayan ng Langit (English: Heaven's Waiting) is a 2018 Philippine romantic slice-of-life drama film directed by Dan Villegas and written by Juan Miguel Severo that was based on his one-act play of the same name. The film stars the veteran film and television legends, Eddie Garcia and Gina Pareño, as the ex-lovers who are living together in an apartment room in the Purgatory. It is a co-production between Globe Studios, an entertainment company division of Globe Telecom and Project 8 Corner San Joaquin Projects, a film production company jointly owned by Dan Villegas and Antoinette Jadaone.

The film was released on October 22, 2018, and it received positive reviews, particularly for the performances of the film's leading stars.

Synopsis
In the Purgatory, Lisang, a woman in her 60s who died due to the complications of diabetes, was remained in the same place for two years due to making trouble with the other souls who died for fun. She wanted to go up in the heaven despite her sins she committed. One day, her room will be leased to a new tenant which is no other than Manolo, her ex-boyfriend who was recently passed away. The two will get along each other but they would reveal their own pain and regrets.

Cast
Eddie Garcia† as Manolo
Gina Pareño as Lisang
Joel Saracho		
Kat Galang
Mary Joy Apostol	
Jomari Angeles		
Geraldine Villamil
Dolly De Leon
Francis Mata	
Karl Medina
Che Ramos	
Mel Kimura

Production
The film was based on the one-act play written by the film's writer Juan Miguel Severo that was originally staged for 2015-2016 Virgin Labfest. The roles of Lisang and Manolo were respectively played by Edna Vida and Nonoy Froilan in a 45-minute one-act, single scene play.

Casting
The film has been served as a reunion movie of Eddie Garcia and Gina Pareño, who were both used to work in Sampaguita Pictures, according to Garcia. Director Dan Villegas has considered working with the two legends in one film as a huge achievement on his expanding film career. According to the director, Gina Pareño was previously involved with him prior to the making of the film but for Eddie Garcia, it was his first time making an involvement and he was in starstruck during their first day but they are very professional and the shooting was peaceful and serene.

Release
The film was first released on October 22, 2018 as one of the entries for the 2018 QCinema International Film Festival. It was also released for nationwide theaters on November 21, 2018.

Overseas release
Hintayan ng Langit premiered in Italy on April 27, 2019 as one of the featured Filipino films for the 21st Udine Far East Film Festival, along with Chito S. Roño's Signal Rock; Joyce Bernal's Miss Granny, and Mikhail Red's Eerie.

Critical reception
One of ABS-CBN's top couples, Kathryn Bernardo and Daniel Padilla, gave a big support for their friend, Juan Miguel Severo, on his first written movie. The writer, a self-confessed KathNiel fan and previously collaborated at their film The Hows of Us, thanked them for showing up at the premiere. Later, Kathryn Bernardo posted a congratulatory message to Severo's first written film on her Instagram story.

On a review by CNN Philippines, Hintayan ng Langit was praised, particularly for its storyline, setting, film editing, cinematography and the stars' performances. The editing was reviewed positive due to utilizing the detail where it affords to flesh out the dynamics of its world better. The acting performances of Eddie Garcia and Gina Pareño was mixed-to-positive as their performances were viewed as undeniably charming but the character dynamics of the film were felt imbalanced. In conclusion, it was still a charming piece of work.

Accolades
At the 2018 QCinema International Film Festival, actor Eddie Garcia and director Dan Villegas won the award for Best Actor and Audience Choice Award, respectively. On August 27, 2019, the film was awarded the Golden Sarmatian Lion Award (President's Prize) from the 12th Orenburg International Film Festival (OIFF, East&West, Classics and Avant Garde) in Orenburg, Russia.

References

External links
 
 
 

Filipino-language films
2018 films
Philippine romantic drama films
2018 drama films